The Wright Handybus was a single-decker bus body built primarily on Dennis Dart chassis by Wrightbus between 1990 and 1995. It was also built on a small number of the higher-floor Leyland Swift chassis. It has a bolted aluminium structure with two windscreen styles.

The outward styling was quite plain, with a flat front. Some vehicles had a single-piece flat windscreen whilst others had two, separate, flat windscreens with the glass on the driver's side being raked back, reminiscent of some 1950s single-decker buses and the Leyland Lynx.

London Regional Transport was the first and also the largest customer, buying nearly 200 Handybus bodied Dennis Darts. Go-Ahead Northern also bought over 80, and Ulsterbus and Citybus had 40 between them. The Handybus was succeeded in 1995 by the Crusader.

Preservation
A former London Regional Transport Handybus has been preserved by the London Transport Museum, Acton.

References

External links

Midibuses
Step-entrance buses
Vehicles introduced in 1990
Handybus